Tapinothelella is a monotypic genus of South African nursery web spiders containing the single species, Tapinothelella laboriosa. It was first described by Embrik Strand in 1909, and is only found in South Africa.

See also
 List of Pisauridae species

References

Monotypic Araneomorphae genera
Pisauridae
Spiders of South Africa
Taxa named by Embrik Strand